The Shin Kee Tract is an island in the Sacramento–San Joaquin River Delta. It is part of San Joaquin County, California, and not managed by any reclamation district. It appears on a 1952 USGS map of the area.

References

Islands of San Joaquin County, California
Islands of the Sacramento–San Joaquin River Delta
Islands of Northern California